This is a list of the operas of the German composer Georg Philipp Telemann (1681–1767).

According to historical sources, Telemann may have written over 50 operas; however, only 35 works are of sufficient substance to appear in his catalogue of works (see below), and only nine of these are preserved complete.

List

Undated fragments

Contributions to operas by other composers

References

External links
TWV catalogue at Université du Québec

 
Lists of operas by composer
Lists of compositions by composer